Shahid Modarres Rural District is a rural district (dehestan) in the Central District of Shushtar County, Khuzestan Province, Iran. At the 2006 census, its population was 10,801, in 2,022 families.  The rural district has 51 villages.

References 

Rural Districts of Khuzestan Province
Shushtar County